Sylvester Ugoh was the Vice Presidential candidate of the National Republican Convention in 1993, the NRC's Presidential candidate being Bashir Tofa.

Ugoh was the governor of Bank of Biafra, Biafran central bank.

References

Living people
Igbo politicians
Central bankers
People from Biafra
Year of birth missing (living people)
Education ministers of Nigeria